The discography of American rapper Ace Hood consists of 4 major-label albums, 2 independent albums, 15 singles, 2 EPs, 21 mixtapes, and 89 guest appearances. 

His major albums, all of which released by We the Best Music, were co-released by Def Jam Recordings for Gutta (2007), Ruthless (2009), and Blood, Sweat & Tears (2011), while Cash Money and Republic Records co-released Trials & Tribulations (2013).

Albums

Studio albums

Mixtapes

Singles

As lead artist

As featured artist

Promotional singles

Other charted songs

Guest appearances

Music videos

As lead artist

As featured artist

See also
DJ Khaled discography

References

Hip hop discographies
 
 
Discographies of American artists